Cabanatuan Cathedral, officially known as the Saint Nicholas of Tolentino Parish Cathedral, is the ecclesiastical seat of the Roman Catholic Diocese of Cabanatuan in the Philippines. It is located at Del Pilar Street, Barangay General Luna, in downtown Cabanatuan, Nueva Ecija province.

The cathedral and the Plaza Lucero at its front, is nationally and historically known as the death place of Filipino general Antonio Luna.

History
After the parishes of Gapan in 1595 and Santor in 1636, the Augustinian priests founded the Cabanatuan church in 1700 as a visita of Gapan. By 1732, it only had 700 parishioners. The parish administration was transferred to secular priests in 1866, and in the same year, the first stone church and convent buildings were constructed under the leadership of Fr. Jose de la Fuente. The said buildings were destroyed by the earthquake of July 18, 1880 and were reconstructed under the helm of Fr. Mariano Rivas in 1891.

During the Philippine–American War, the cathedral's convent, shortly served as the seat of the capital of the Philippines where Antonio Luna and his aide-de-camp, Francisco Román, were killed by the members of the Kawit Battalion on June 5, 1899. In 1934, the church was razed by fire wherein only its lateral walls were spared. Nine years after the canonical foundation of the Diocese of Cabanatuan, the cathedral, and its adjacent former College of the Immaculate Conception building, was charred again on September 28, 1972. Three years later, on November 22, 1975, the church reconstruction was finished under Msgr. Pacifico Araullo. It was dedicated by then Cabanatuan Bishop Vicente Reyes and then Apostolic Nuncio to the Philippines, Bruno Torpigliani.

A new cathedral, locally called as crypta, is being constructed since 1999 in Sumacab Este, Cabanatuan that can accommodate 3,000 people.

Gallery

References

External links
 Diocesan website 
 Facebook page  

Buildings and structures in Cabanatuan
Roman Catholic churches in Nueva Ecija
Roman Catholic cathedrals in the Philippines
Roman Catholic churches completed in 1866
Roman Catholic churches completed in 1975
16th-century Roman Catholic church buildings in the Philippines
17th-century Roman Catholic church buildings in the Philippines
18th-century Roman Catholic church buildings in the Philippines
20th-century Roman Catholic church buildings in the Philippines
19th-century religious buildings and structures in the Philippines